La Voz Senior (Spanish for The Voice Senior) is a Spanish reality talent show that premiered on 8 May 2019 on Antena 3. It is part of the international syndication The Voice based on the original Dutch television program The Voice of Holland, created by Dutch television producer John de Mol. When Atresmedia announced the acquisition of the format in June 2018, they announced they would produce La Voz Senior, where elders over 60 will compete against each other.

Format
The show consists of three phases: a blind audition, a battle phase, and the live performance shows. Four judges also known as coaches, all noteworthy recording artists, choose teams of contestants through a blind audition process. Each judge has the length of the auditioner's performance (about one minute) to decide if he or she wants that performer on his or her team; if two or more judges want the same performer (as happens frequently), the performer has the final choice of which coach's team to join.

After the coaches fill each respective slots in their team the batch of singers in the team is mentored and developed by its respective coach. In the second stage, called the knockout phase, coaches have all of their team members perform a song in the stage that look like a battle ring, with the coach choosing which team member to advance from each of individual "battles" into the semi-finals.

Within the semi-final, the surviving eight acts from each team again compete head-to-head, with the coach determining one of two acts from their team that will advance to the final four.

In the final phase, the remaining four acts perform for the last time head-to-head, with one senior crowned La Voz Senior.

Coaches and hosts

Coaches
On 14 November 2018, David Bisbal was announced as the first coach for La Voz Senior. Two days later Antena 3 confirmed the coaching panel for the senior version would be Bisbal, Pablo López, Antonio Orozco and Paulina Rubio. The series premiered on May 8, 2019. On 15 October 2019, Pastora Soler and Rosana Arbelo were announced as new coaches for the series' second season. A day later, it was announced that Orozco would return to the panel along with a third new coach, David Bustamante. Season three saw Bustamante and Orozco return as panelists, joined by Niña Pastori and José Mercé who both debuted as coaches.

Key 
 Featured as a full-time coach
 Featured as a part-time advisor

Presenter timeline

Season summary 
Warning: the following table presents a significant amount of different colors.

Coaches' teams

Season 1: 2019 

Season One premiered on Antena 3 on 8 May and lasted until 26 June 2019.

Each coach was allowed to advance two artists to the live shows:

Season 2: 2020 

The second season premiered on Antena 3 on 10 December and ended on 27 December 2020.

Season 3: 2022 
The third season premiered on Antena 3 on 8 January, and concluded on 29 January.

References

External links

Spain
2019 Spanish television series debuts
Spanish reality television series
Antena 3 (Spanish TV channel) original programming